Dhanpuri is a city and a municipality in Shahdol district  in the state of Madhya Pradesh, India.

Demographics
As of the 2001 India census, Dhanpuri had a population of 43,914. Males constitute 53% of the population and females 47%. Dhanpuri has an average literacy rate of 75%, higher than the national average of 59.5%: male literacy is 82% and, female literacy is 68%. In Dhanpuri, 14% of the population is under 6 years of age. 
This area is mainly known for coal mines and the Jwalamukhi temple. And the mosque which is famous in this area is Noori Masjid which is known for its unity between Hindu and Muslim brotherhood Amarkantak is 75 km distant.

References

Cities and towns in Shahdol district
Shahdol